Tshilidzi Thomas Gumbu (born 27 March 1967) is a South African politician from Limpopo who has been a member of the National Assembly of South Africa since 2019. Gumbu is a member of the African National Congress.

Education and career
Gumbu has matric. He has worked as a regional organiser for the African National Congress.

Parliamentary career
Gumbu stood for election to the National Assembly of South Africa in the 2019 general election as a candidate on the ANC's list of Limpopo National Assembly candidates. He was elected as the ANC won 15 list seats in the province.

On 22 May 2019, Gumbu became a Member of Parliament in the National Assembly. As of June 2019, he serves on the Portfolio Committee on Communications.

References

External links

Living people
1967 births
People from Limpopo
African National Congress politicians
21st-century South African politicians
Members of the National Assembly of South Africa